The 1989 European Parliament election was a European election held across the 12 European Community member states in June 1989. It was the third European election but the first time that Spain and Portugal voted at the same time as the other members (they joined in 1986). Overall turnout dropped to 59%.

Electoral system

There was no single voting system for all member states but each of them adopted its own method, established by national law.

The United Kingdom used a one-round (first-past-the-post) system of 78 constituencies in England, Wales and Scotland, while in Northern Ireland 3 proportional seats were allocated. Belgium, Ireland and Italy used a proportional system with subdivision of the territory into constituencies. Denmark, France, West Germany, Greece, Luxembourg, the Netherlands, Portugal and Spain used a single national proportional system, although in the case of West Germany the three seats for the West Berlin area were not directly elected but were chosen by the Berlin House of Representatives, given the particular status of the city.

Seat changes
These were the first elections Portugal and Spain took part in with the other states. Spain was allocated 60 seats and Portugal was allocated 24; the number of seats for the other states remained the same, raising the total number of seats from 434 to 518.

Results

The Socialists held their third consecutive victory, rising to 180 seats (166 pre-election), with the People's Party managing to win only 8 extra seats. However, the European Democrats had a massive loss of 32 of the 66 seats, knocking them from third to sixth largest party. The liberals, who had already risen one place with the byelections in Spain and Portugal earlier, gained an extra seat, holding their new-found third place with both the Rainbow and Communist groups splitting post-election.

Results by country

Statistics

External links
 The election of the Members of the European Parliament European Navigator
 Full Election Details Elections Online (In French)

 
1989 elections in Europe
June 1989 events in Europe